Nigel Hasselbaink (born 21 November 1990) is a professional footballer who plays as a forward. Born in the Netherlands, he represents the Suriname national team.

Personal life
Hasselbaink was born and raised in the Netherlands. He is the nephew of former Leeds United, Chelsea and Middlesbrough striker Jimmy Floyd Hasselbaink.

Club career
Born in Amsterdam, Hasselbaink began his career at PSV and by 2007, Hasselbaink signed his first professional contract with PSV. He failed to make a senior appearance for the side, and instead made his professional début during the second half of the 2009–10 season while on loan at Go Ahead Eagles in the Eerste Divisie. After his loan spell at Go Ahead Eagles, Hasselbaink was released by the club.

On 23 August 2010, Hasselbaink signed for Hamilton Academical on a free transfer following his release by PSV, after impressing manager Billy Reid while on trial. He made his début for Hamilton in the Scottish Premier League four days later, in a 1–0 victory against Inverness Caledonian Thistle.

On 6 June 2011, Hasselbaink moved to St Mirren, signing a one-year contract along with Paul McGowan. Hasselbaink made his debut for the club in a 0–0 draw against Dunfermline Athletic on 25 July 2011 where he played 90 minutes. Hasselbaink scored his first league goal for the club on 30 July 2011, against Aberdeen which was the only goal in the game. On 6 August 2011, Hasselbaink provided an assist for Steven Thompson but received a straight red card for Unsportsmanlike conduct towards Paul Dixon in a 1–1 draw against Dundee United. After receiving a red card, the club appealed for his sending off but lost the appeal, becoming the first player to go through new streamlined disciplinary procedures.

At the end of the season, Manager Danny Lennon says the club offered both Hasselbaink and Jeroen Tesselaar a new contract due to their good performances throughout the season and felt 'confident' and 'optimistic' of keeping both of them at the club. Whilst negotiations were taking place, club captain Jim Goodwin pleaded the duo to sign a new contract and show their loyalty.

In May 2012, Hasselbaink turned down an improved contract from St Mirren and left the club with clubs from England and Scotland chasing to sign him.

By 28 June 2012, Hasselbaink signed with St Johnstone. After his move to St Johnstone, Hasselbaink says he made a right decision to joining St Johnstone and revealed that manager Steve Lomas convinced him that he has taken the best decision for his promising career. Hasselbaink also revealed that he had offers from several English clubs. Hasselbaink was praised by manager Steve Lomas, and he has formed a striking partnership with Grégory Tadé. In his first season at St Johnstone, Hasselbaink scored seven goals in forty-two appearances in all competitions, including scoring a 2–0 win over Motherwell to earn St Johnstone a place for Europa League next season.

However, in 2013–14 season, Hasselbaink partnership with Tade came to an end after Tade left for Romania. Hasselbaink then scored his first goal of the season, in a 4–0 win over Ross County on 11 August 2013. Hasselbaink went on to score four more goals this season and made thirty-nine appearances in all competitions. Hasselbaink was released by the club at the end of the 2013–14 season. His release came when Hasslebaink was an un-used substitute for the Scottish Cup Final, which St Johnstone won 2–0 against Dundee United to win the club's first Scottish Cup in their first final appearance.

On 31 July 2014 he signed for Greek club Veria. However, making one appearance, Hasselbaink was released by the club on 2 February 2015.

In February 2015 he re-signed for Hamilton Academical until the end of the season. Hasselbaink made his Hamilton Academical debut, making his first start, in a 4–0 loss against Celtic on 22 February 2015. Hasselbaink then scored his first Hamilton Academical on his return, in a 3–2 win over Kilmarnock on 2 May 2015. He was released by Hamilton at the end of the 2014–15 season. He returned to the Netherlands in Excelsior in later 2015.

On 2 November 2020, Hasselbaink joined another Israeli Premier League side, signing for Bnei Sakhnin.

International career
Hasselbaink debuted for the Suriname national football team in an unofficial friendly 3–2 loss to Curaçao wherein he scored his debut goal. In November 2019 Hasselbaink was called up to represent Suriname in Gold Cup qualification matches. He scored his first official international goal in a 2–1 CONCACAF Nations League win over Nicaragua. On 27 March 2021 he scored a hat-trick against Aruba. In June 2021 Hasselbaink was named to the Suriname squad for the 2021 CONCACAF Gold Cup, where he scored the winning goal in Suriname's 2-1 triumph over Guadeloupe in their final group match.

Career statistics

International
Scores and results list Suriname's goal tally first.

Honours
St Johnstone
Scottish Cup: 2013–14

References

External links

Nigel Hasselbaink at Israel Football Association
 Nigel Hasselbaink Interview

1990 births
Living people
Footballers from Amsterdam
Surinamese footballers
Suriname international footballers
Dutch footballers
Dutch sportspeople of Surinamese descent
Association football wingers
Association football forwards
PSV Eindhoven players
Go Ahead Eagles players
Hamilton Academical F.C. players
St Mirren F.C. players
St Johnstone F.C. players
Veria F.C. players
Excelsior Rotterdam players
Hapoel Ironi Kiryat Shmona F.C. players
Hapoel Be'er Sheva F.C. players
Eredivisie players
Eerste Divisie players
Scottish Premier League players
Scottish Professional Football League players
Super League Greece players
Israeli Premier League players
Dutch expatriate footballers
Surinamese expatriate footballers
Expatriate footballers in Scotland
Expatriate footballers in Greece
Expatriate footballers in Israel
Dutch expatriate sportspeople in Scotland
Dutch expatriate sportspeople in Greece
Dutch expatriate sportspeople in Israel
Surinamese expatriate sportspeople in Scotland
Surinamese expatriate sportspeople in Greece
Surinamese expatriate sportspeople in Israel
Bnei Sakhnin F.C. players
2021 CONCACAF Gold Cup players